Zaslavsky, Zaslavski, Zaslavskii, Zaslavskiy or Zasławski (Polish) is a masculine surname of Polish origin.  The feminine counterpart (in Slavic countries) of "Zaslavsky" is Zaslavskaya or Zaslavskaia; that of "Zasławski" is Zasławska. The name may refer to
Denis Zaslavsky (born 1967), Russian professor dermatovenereologist
Aleksandr Zaslavsky (born 1996), Russian football player
Zedd (musician) (born 1989 as Anton Zaslavski), Russian-German musician, music producer, and DJ
Claudia Zaslavsky (1917–2006), American educator and ethnomathematician
David Zaslavsky (1880-1965), Soviet journalist
Dora Zaslavsky (1905–1987), American pianist 
George Zaslavsky (1935–2008), Soviet mathematical physicist 
Tatyana Zaslavskaya (1927–2013), Russian economic sociologist
Thomas Zaslavsky (born 1945), American mathematician, son of Claudia
Victor Zaslavsky (1937–2009), Soviet political sociologist
Ilya Zaslavskiy (born 1960), Russian politician and disability advocate
Aleksander Zasławski (died 1629), Polish-Lithuanian noble
Aleksander Janusz Zasławski-Ostrogski (1650–1682), Polish-Lithuanian noble
Symeon Zaslawski and Michal Zaslawski, sons of Jaunutis (14th century), Grand Duke of Lithuania
Teofila Ludwika Zasławska (ca. 1650 – 1709), Polish noble
Władysław Dominik Zasławski-Ostrogski (ca. 1616 – 1656), Polish noble
Zasławski family, Polish–Ruthenian nobility
Max Zaslofsky (1925–1985), American professional basketball player and coach

Related pages are
Iziaslav of Kiev (disambiguation) (11th – 12th centuries), Kievan princes
Izyaslav of Polotsk (10th century), Kievan prince
Hope Holiday (born 1930 as Hope Jane Zee, originally Zaslawsky), American actress

Related places:
Iziaslav, Ukraine or Zaslav, city in Volhynia, Ukraine
Zaslavsky Uyezd, former subdivision of Volhynia, Russian Empire, containing city of Iziaslav
Iziaslav Raion, former district in Ukraine containing city of Iziaslav
Duchy of Zaslawye, former territory now in Belarus
Zaslawye, town in Belarus

See also
 
 Zaslav (disambiguation)

Polish-language surnames